Lev Sergeyevich Termen (18963 November 1993), better known as Leon Theremin, was a Russian inventor, most famous for his invention of the theremin, one of the first electronic musical instruments and the first to be mass-produced. He also worked on early television research. His listening device, "The Thing", hung for seven years in plain view in the United States Ambassador's Moscow office and enabled Soviet agents to eavesdrop on secret conversations.

Early life
Leon Theremin was born in Saint Petersburg, Russian Empire in 1896. His father was Sergei Emilievich Theremin of French Huguenot descent. His mother was Yevgenia Antonova Orzhinskaya and of German ancestry. He had a sister named Helena.

In the seventh class of his high school before an audience of students and parents he demonstrated various optical effects using electricity.

By the age of 17, when he was in his last year of high school, he had his own laboratory at home for experimenting with high-frequency circuits, optics and magnetic fields. His cousin, Kirill Fedorovich Nesturkh, then a young physicist, invited him to attend the defense of the dissertation of Abram Fedorovich Ioffe. Physics lecturer Vladimir Konstantinovich Lebedinskiy had explained to Theremin the dispute over Ioffe's work on the electron. On 9 May 1913 Theremin and his cousin attended Ioffe's dissertation defense. Ioffe's subject was on the elementary photoelectric effect, the magnetic field of cathode rays and related investigations. In 1917 Theremin wrote that Ioffe talked of electrons, the photoelectric effect and magnetic fields as parts of an objective reality that surrounds us every day, unlike others that talked more of somewhat abstract formulae and symbols. Theremin wrote that he found this explanation revelatory and that it fit a scientific – not abstract – view of the world, different scales of magnitude, and matter. From then on Theremin endeavoured to study the microcosm, in the same way he had studied the macrocosm with his hand-built telescope. Later, Kyrill introduced Theremin to Ioffe as a young experimenter and physicist, and future student of the university.

Theremin recalled that while still in his last year of school, he had built a million-volt Tesla coil and noticed a strong glow associated with his attempts to ionise the air. He then wished to further investigate the effects using university resources. A chance meeting with Abram Fedorovich Ioffe led to a recommendation to see Karl Karlovich Baumgart, who was in charge of the physics laboratory equipment. Karl then reserved a room and equipment for Theremin's experiments. Abram Fedorovich suggested Theremin also look at methods of creating gas fluorescence under different conditions and of examining the resulting light's spectra. However, during these investigations Theremin was called up for World War I military service.

World War I and Russian Civil War
Although only in his second academic year, the deanery of the Faculty of Physics and Astronomy recommended that Theremin go to the Nikolayevska Military Engineering School in Petrograd (previously Saint Petersburg), which usually only accepted students in their fourth year. Theremin recalled that Ioffe reassured him that the war would not last long and that military experience would be useful for scientific applications.

Beginning his military service in 1916, Theremin finished the Military Engineering School in six months, progressed through the Graduate Electronic School for Officers, and attained the military radio-engineer diploma in the same year. In the course of the next three and a half years he oversaw the construction of a radio station in Saratov to connect the Volga area with Moscow, graduated from Petrograd University, became deputy leader of the new Military Radiotechnical Laboratory in Moscow, and finished as the broadcast supervisor of the radio transmitter at Tsarskoye Selo near Petrograd (then renamed Detskoye Selo).

During the Russian civil war, in October 1919 White Army commander Nikolai Nikolayevich Yudenich advanced on Petrograd from the side of Detskoye Selo, apparently intending to capture the radio station to announce a victory over the Bolsheviks. Theremin and others evacuated the station, sending equipment east on rail cars. Theremin then detonated explosives to destroy the 120-meter-high antennae mast before traveling to Petrograd to set up an international listening station. There he also trained radio specialists but reported difficulties obtaining food and working with foreign experts whom he described as narrow-minded pessimists.

Theremin recalled that on an evening when his hopes of overcoming these obstructing experts reached a low ebb, Abram Fedorovich Ioffe telephoned him. Ioffe asked Theremin to come to his newly founded Physical Technical Institute in Petrograd, and the next day he invited him to start work at developing measuring methods for high-frequency electrical oscillations.

Under Ioffe
The day after Ioffe's invitation, Theremin started at the institute. He worked in diverse fields: applying the Laue effect to the new field of X-ray analysis of crystals; using hypnosis to improve measurement-reading accuracy; working with Ivan Pavlov's laboratory; and using gas-filled lamps as measuring devices. He built a high-frequency oscillator to measure the dielectric constant of gases with high precision; Ioffe then urged him to look for other applications using this method, and shortly made the first motion detector for use as a "radio watchman".

While adapting the dielectric device by adding circuitry to generate an audio tone, Theremin noticed that the pitch changed when his hand moved around. In October 1920 he first demonstrated this to Ioffe who called in other professors and students to hear. Theremin recalled trying to find the notes for tunes he remembered from when he played the cello, such as The Swan, by Saint-Saëns. By November 1920, Theremin had given his first public concert with the instrument, now modified with a horizontal volume antenna replacing the earlier foot-operated volume control.

On 24 May 1924 Theremin married 20-year-old Katia Konstantinova, and they lived together in his parents' apartment on Marat street.

In 1925 Theremin went to Germany to sell both the radio watchman and Termenvox patents to the German firm Goldberg and Sons. According to Glinsky, this was the Soviet's "decoy for capitalists" to obtain both Western profits from sales and technical knowledge.

During this time Theremin was also working on a wireless television with 16 scan lines in 1925, improving to 32 scan lines and then 64 using interlacing in 1926, and he demonstrated moving, if blurry, images on 7 June 1927. His device was the first functioning television apparatus in Russia.

United States

After being sent on a lengthy tour of Europe starting 1927 – including London, Paris and towns in Germany – during which he demonstrated his invention to full audiences, Theremin went to the United States, arriving on 30 December 1927 with his first wife Katia. He performed the theremin with the New York Philharmonic in 1928. He patented his invention in the United States in 1928 and subsequently granted commercial production rights to RCA.

Theremin set up a laboratory in New York in the 1930s, where he further refined the theremin and experimented with other inventions and new electronic musical instruments. These included the Rhythmicon, commissioned by the Russian composer and theorist Joseph Schillinger.

In 1930, ten thereminists performed on stage at Carnegie Hall. Two years later, Theremin conducted the first-ever electronic orchestra, featuring the theremin and other electronic instruments including a "fingerboard" theremin which resembled a cello in use (Theremin was a cellist).

In 1931, he worked with composer Joseph Schillinger to build an instrument called the rhythmicon.  They were lucky to have gotten it to market as quickly as they did as brothers Otto and Benjamin Miessner had almost completed a similar instrument with the same name.

Theremin's mentors during this time were some of society's foremost scientists, composers, and musical theorists, including composer Joseph Schillinger and physicist (and amateur violinist) Albert Einstein.

At this time, Theremin worked closely with fellow Soviet émigré and theremin virtuoso Clara Rockmore (née Reisenberg). Theremin had several times 
proposed to her, but she chose to marry attorney Robert Rockmore, and thereafter used his name professionally.

The U.S. Federal Bureau of Prisons hired Theremin to build a metal detector for Alcatraz Federal Penitentiary.

Theremin was interested in a role for the theremin in dance music. He developed performance locations that could automatically react to dancers' movements with varied patterns of sound and light.

The Soviet consulate had apparently demanded he divorce Katia. Afterwards, while working with the American Negro Ballet Company, the inventor married a young African-American prima ballerina Lavinia Williams. Their marriage caused shock and disapproval in his social circles, but the ostracized couple remained together.

Return to the Soviet Union
Theremin abruptly returned to the Soviet Union in 1938. At the time, the reasons for his return were unclear; some claimed that he was homesick, while others believed that he had been kidnapped by Soviet officials. Beryl Campbell, one of Theremin's dancers, said his wife Lavinia "called to say that he had been kidnapped from his studio" and that "some Russians had come in" and that she felt that he was going to be spirited out of the country.

Many years later, it was revealed that Theremin had returned to his native land due to tax and financial difficulties in the United States. However, Theremin himself once told Bulat Galeyev that he decided to leave himself because he was anxious about the approaching war. Shortly after he returned he was imprisoned in the Butyrka prison and later sent to work in the Kolyma gold mines. Although rumors of his execution were widely circulated and published, Theremin was put to work in a sharashka (a secret laboratory in the Gulag camp system), together with Andrei Tupolev, Sergei Korolev and other well-known scientists and engineers. The Soviet Union rehabilitated him in 1956.

Espionage

During his work at the sharashka, where he was put in charge of other workers, Theremin created the Buran eavesdropping system. A precursor to the modern laser microphone, it worked by using a low-power infrared beam from a distance to detect sound vibrations in glass windows. Lavrentiy Beria, the head of the secret police organization NKVD (the predecessor of the KGB), used the Buran device to spy on the British, French and US embassies in Moscow. According to Galeyev, Beria also spied on Stalin; Theremin kept some of the tapes in his flat. In 1947, Theremin was awarded the Stalin prize for inventing this advance in Soviet espionage technology.

Theremin invented another listening device called The Thing, hidden in a replica of the Great Seal of the United States carved in wood. In 1945, Soviet school children presented the concealed bug to the U.S. Ambassador as a "gesture of friendship" to the USSR's World War II ally. It hung in the ambassador’s residential office in Moscow and intercepted confidential conversations there during the first seven years of the Cold War, until it was accidentally discovered in 1952.

Later life

After his release from the sharashka in 1947, Theremin volunteered to remain working with the KGB until 1966. By 1947 Theremin had remarried, to Maria Guschina, his third wife, and they had two children: Lena and Natalia.

Theremin worked at the Moscow Conservatory of Music for 10 years where he taught, and built theremins, electronic cellos and some terpsitones (another invention of Theremin). There he was discovered by Harold Schonberg, the chief music critic of The New York Times, who was visiting the Conservatory. But when an article by Schonberg appeared mentioning Theremin, the Conservatory's Managing Director declared that "electricity is not good for music; electricity is to be used for electrocution" and had his instruments removed from the Conservatory. Further electronic music projects were banned, and Theremin was summarily dismissed.

In the 1970s, Leon Theremin was a Professor of Physics at Moscow State University (Department of Acoustics) developing his inventions and supervising graduate students.

After 51 years in the Soviet Union Theremin started travelling, first visiting France in June 1989 and then the United States in 1991, each time accompanied by his daughter Natalia. Theremin was brought to New York by filmmaker Steven M. Martin where he was reunited with Clara Rockmore. He also made a demonstration concert at the Royal Conservatory of The Hague in early 1993 before dying in Moscow on Wednesday 3 November 1993 at the age of 97.

Family 
 Katia (Ekaterina Pavlovna) Konstantinova, first spouse
 Lavinia Williams, second spouse (no children)
 Maria Gushina, third spouse
 Elena "Lena" Theremin - daughter;
 Natalia Theremin - daughter;
 Maria "Masha" Alekseyevna Theremin - granddaughter;
 Olga Theremin - granddaughter;
 Peter Theremin - great-grandson.

Media 
The feature-length documentary film Theremin: An Electronic Odyssey was released in 1993.

His life story and his Great Seal bug invention were featured in a 2012 episode of the Dark Matters: Twisted But True.

In 2000, University of Illinois Press published Theremin: Ether Music and Espionage by Albert Glinsky, with a foreword by Robert Moog.

In 2014, Canadian writer Sean Michaels published the novel Us Conductors, which was inspired by the relationship between Leon Theremin and Clara Rockmore. The novel won the 2014 Scotiabank Giller Prize.

In 2022, French writer Emmanuel Villin published the novel La Fugue Thérémine (éditions Asphalte), which looks back on the life of Leon Theremin.

Inventions
Theremin (1920)
Burglar alarm, or "Signalling Apparatus" which used the Theremin effect (1920s).

Electromechanical television – Nipkow disk with mirrors instead of slots (ca. 1925).
Terpsitone – platform that converts dance movements into tones (1932).
Theremin cello – an electronic cello with no strings and no bow, using a plastic fingerboard, a handle for volume and two knobs for sound shaping (ca. 1930).
Keyboard theremin (ca. 1930), a small keyboard "with hornlike tones".
Rhythmicon – world's first drum machine (1931).
The Buran eavesdropping device (1947 or earlier).
The Great Seal bug, also known as "The Thing" – one of the first passive covert listening devices; first used by the USSR for spying (1945 or earlier). It is considered a predecessor of RFID technology.

See also
Spharophon, a Theremin-like instrument made by Jörg Mager around 1921
Lee de Forest, inventor of the amplifying vacuum tube
The Trautonium, an early electronic instrument contemporary with the theremin invented by Friedrich Trautwein and later developed by Oskar Sala
Maurice Martenot, inventor of the Ondes Martenot, a keyboard-based instrument using the heterodyning method
Robert Moog
Raymond Scott

Notes

References

Sources

 Linked from LMJ 6

 
 copied here Theremin Vox - An Interview with Leon Theremin
 Sections translated by Felix Eder from the Russian originals in:

External links

 Andrey Smirnov – theremin sensors workshop (selected demonstrations of Theremin sensors and laser bugging.) Retrieved 2009-09-11
 Theremin Centre, Moscow, holds Lev Sergeivitch Termen archives (Russian only)

 
1896 births
1993 deaths
Soviet engineers
Soviet inventors
Soviet musicians
Inventors of musical instruments
T
Sharashka inmates
Stalin Prize winners
Academic staff of Moscow State University
Russian people of French descent
Russian people of German descent
Engineers from Saint Petersburg
Burials at Kuntsevo Cemetery
Musicians from Saint Petersburg
Soviet expatriates in the United States